The following is a timeline of the history of the city of Frankfurt am Main, Germany.

Prior to 19th century

 843 CE – City becomes capital of East Francia.
 1180 – Staufenmauer built.
 1241 – Judenschlacht – First of two pogroms of Jews in the city. 
 1333 – City expands.
 1349 – Judenschlacht.
 1360 – Schützenverein Frankfurt-Höchst (militia) formed.
 1370 – Public clock installed (approximate date).
 1372
 Free City of Frankfurt becomes part of Holy Roman Empire.
 City buys forest from Charles IV.
 1405 – Römer converted into city hall.
 1428 – Eschenheimer Turm built.
 1462 – Frankfurter Judengasse established.
 1493 – Passion play begins.
 1531 – Printing press in operation.
 1581 – Rumpolt's cookbook published.
 1585 – Bourse established.
 1648 – Peace of Westphalia confirms Frankfurt as an Imperial Free City.
 1681 – St. Catherine's Church built.
 1719 – Fire.
 1739 – Palais Thurn und Taxis built.
 1742 – The Palais Barckhaus at Zeil in Frankfurt serves as residence of Emperor Charles VII until 1744
 1748 – Gebrüder Bethmann formed.
 1750 – Mainzer Landstraße built.
 1759 – January: City occupied by French.
 1774 – Botanical garden laid out.
 1790 – 9 October: Coronation of Leopold II, Holy Roman Emperor.
 1792 – City occupied by French.

19th century
 1806
 City occupied by French.
 City becomes Principality of Frankfurt, under Karl Theodor Anton Maria von Dalberg.
 1808 – Frankfurter Opern- und Museumsorchester (orchestra) established.
 1810 – City becomes part of Grand Duchy of Frankfurt.
 1812 – City refortified.
 1815 – Städel founded.
 1816 – Free City of Frankfurt becomes part of German Confederation.
 1817 – Population: 41,458 
 1829 – Frankfurter Kunstverein founded.
 1833
 Frankfurter Wachensturm.
 Paulskirche built.
 1839 – Taunus Railway begins operating.
 1840 – Population: 55,269 
 1843 –  (stock exchange) built.
 1846 – International Penitentiary Congress held in Frankfurt.
 1848
 September: "Uprising."
 Frankfurt Assembly formed.
 1849 – Constitution of the German Empire proclaimed by Frankfurt Parliament.
 1856 – Frankfurter Zeitung begins publication.
 1858 – Frankfurt Zoological Garden founded.
 1859 – Frankfurt City Link Line begins operating.
 1861 – Population: 71,462.
 1863 –  founded in Frankfurt.
 1864 – Population: 77,372 
 1866 – City becomes part of Hesse-Nassau, Prussia.
 1867 – Frankfurt Cathedral rebuilt.
 1868 – Eiserner Steg (bridge) built.
 1871
 Treaty of Frankfurt signed.
 Palmengarten opens.
 1872 – Trams begin operating.
 1875 – Population: 103,136. 
 1878 – Dr. Hoch's Konservatorium – Musikakademie founded.
 1879 –  (market) opens.
 1880 – Alte Oper inaugurated.
 1881 – Metallgesellschaft founded.
 1886 – Frankfurter Friedensverein (peace group) organized.
 1890 – Population: 179,985 
 1895
 Bockenheim becomes part of city.
 Stempel Type Foundry established.
 Population: 229,279.
 1897 – Frankfurt Motor Show begins.

20th century

1900s–1940s

 1904 – Museum der Weltkulturen founded.
 1905 – Population: 334,978. 
 1907
 May: City hosts the 1907 World Weightlifting Championships and 1907 World Wrestling Championships.
 1909
 Städtische Galerie Liebieghaus established.
 Festhalle built.
 1914 – University of Frankfurt established.
 1919 – Population: 433,002.
 1923 – Institute for Social Research founded.
 1925 –  (monument) installed.
 1926 – Alte Brücke (Frankfurt) (bridge) rebuilt.
 1928
 Höchst becomes part of city.
 Großmarkthalle built.
 Polish Consulate relocated from Cologne to Frankfurt.
 Population: 551,200.
 1929
 Frankfurt Radio Symphony Orchestra formed.
 Holy Cross Church built.
 1930 – IG Farben Building constructed.
 1931 – Frankfurter Volksbank Stadion opens.
 1934 – Adlerwerke vorm. Heinrich Kleyer established.
 1936
 Frankfurt Airport opens.
 Grüneburgpark opens.
 1937 – Nazi camp for Sinti and Romani people established (see also Porajmos).
 1938 – Frankfurt University of Music and Performing Arts founded.
 1942
 Nazi camp for Sinti and Romani people dissolved.
 February: Forced labour camp established in the Heddernheim district.
 1944 – Bombing begins.

 1945
 18 March: Forced labour camp in Heddernheim dissolved. Prisoners deported to the Buchenwald concentration camp.
 26–29 March: Battle of Frankfurt
 July: American zone of Allied-occupied Germany headquartered in Frankfurt.
 Frankfurter Rundschau begins publication.
 1946 – Eschwege displaced persons camp set up.
 1948
 Hessischer Rundfunk begins broadcasting.
 Bank deutscher Länder headquartered in Frankfurt.
 1949
 Frankfurt Book Fair resumes.
 Deutsches Institut für Filmkunde founded.
 Frankfurter Allgemeine Zeitung (newspaper) begins publication.

1950s–1990s
 1951 – Opern- und Schauspielhaus Frankfurt built.
 1953 – Population: 600,579.
 1954 – Goethe House opens.
 1955 – Frankfurt Egelsbach Airport opens.
 1957 – Deutsche Bundesbank headquartered in Frankfurt.
 1958
 Noor Mosque built.
 Museum für Kommunikation Frankfurt and Cinema Kino open.
 1959 –  (prison) begins operating.
 1960
  founded.
 City twinned with Lyon, France.
 1963 – Frankfurt Auschwitz Trials begin.
 1966 – City twinned with Birmingham, United Kingdom.
 1967 – City twinned with Deuil-La Barre, France.
 1968 – Frankfurt U-Bahn begins operating.
 1970
 Peace Research Institute Frankfurt and  founded.
 City twinned with Milan, Italy.
 1974 – City-Haus built.
 1978
 Rhine-Main S-Bahn begins operating.
 Historic Railway museum founded.
 1979
 Europaturm built.
 Titanic magazine begins publication.
 City twinned with Cairo, Egypt.
 1980 – City twinned with Tel Aviv, Israel.
 1981
 Frankfurt Marathon begins.
 Museum für Moderne Kunst founded.
 1984 – German Architecture Museum opens.
 1987 –  founded.
 1988 – City twinned with Guangzhou, China.
 1989
 City hosts Bundesgartenschau (garden show).
 City twinned with Toronto, Canada.
 1990
 May: City hosts the 1990 European Judo Championships.
 City twinned with Budapest, Hungary, and Prague, Czech Republic.
 1991
 Andreas von Schoeler becomes mayor.
 City twinned with Granada, Nicaragua, Kraków, Poland, and Leipzig.
 1992 –  (Institute for City History) established.
 1993
 Westendstrasse 1 built.
 Deutsche Börse headquartered in Frankfurt.
 1994 – European Monetary Institute headquartered in Frankfurt.
 1995
 Deutscher Commercial Internet Exchange founded.
 Petra Roth becomes mayor.
 1996 – City website online (approximate date).
 1998 – European Central Bank headquartered in Frankfurt.
 1999 – Main Tower built.
 2000
 Museum Giersch opens.
 Population: 646,550.

21st century

 2001 –  Metropolis (movie theatre) in business.
 2002 – Köln–Frankfurt high-speed rail line begins operating.
 2003
 Bikeshare program launched.
  (monument) installed.
 2005
 Wikimania conference held in city.
 2007
 Holy Cross - Centre for Christian Meditation and Spirituality of the Roman Catholic Diocese of Limburg in the Holy Cross Church in Bornheim founded.
 City twinned with Dubai, United Arab Emirates.
 2009 – Zeil renovated.
 2011
 June–July: City co-hosts the 2011 FIFA Women's World Cup.
 City twinned with Yokohama, Japan.
 2012
 Peter Feldmann becomes mayor.
 2013 – City twinned with Eskişehir, Turkey.
 2014 – Population: 714,241.
 2015
 Economic unrest.
 City twinned with Philadelphia, United States.

See also
 History of Frankfurt am Main
 List of mayors of Frankfurt

Other cities in the state of Hesse:(de)
 Timeline of Kassel

References

This article incorporates information from the German Wikipedia.

Bibliography

in English
Published in 18th–19th centuries
 
 
 

Published in 20th century
 
 
 
  + 1882 ed.
 
 
 
  (chronology)

in German
  circa 1646/1655
  (bibliography)

External links

 Tourismus+Congress GmbH. Frankfurt City History

Years in Germany
 
Frankfurt am Main
frankfurt